Voitto Valdemar Kolho (born Saxberg, 6 February 1885 – 4 October 1963) was a Finnish sport shooter, who won an Olympic bronze and five Finnish national championships.

Shooting

Olympics 

He was the leader of Finland's shooting team in the 1952 Summer Olympics and a deputy member of the board of the Finnish Olympic Committee in 1957–1960.

International 

Kolho competed at the 1914 and the 1924 ISSF World Shooting Championships.

National 

He won five Finnish national championship golds in shooting:
 150 metre free rifle, standing: 1919, 1920, 1921
 150 metre free rifle, three positions: 1920
 center-fire pistol, rapid fire: 1930
He won a shooting competition at the Finnish Winter Games 1919 in Helsinki, the largest shooting competition in Finland yet at the time.

He was a founding member of Finnish Shooting Sport Federation and a member of the board in 1919–1921 and a vice-chairman 1953–1957.

Other 

He was born to farmer Abram Evert Kolho and Eulalia Riihimäki. Olympic shooters Lauri and Yrjö Kolho were his brothers, as was architect Vilho Kolho. Born Saxberg, they finnicized the family name to Kolho on 12 May 1906.

He married Eira Helena Nylund (1895–1984). They had four children:
 Ritva (1929–)
 Maija-Stiina (1930–)
 Mauri (1933–1978)
 Kai (1933–)

He graduated as a Master of Science (Technology) from the Helsinki University of Technology in 1912. He was a senior engineer and a member of the board in the Enso-Gutzeit Oy in 1935–1950. He was awarded an honorary doctorate in technology.

In the municipal elections of 1936 he was elected in Jääski and was a member of the National Coalition Party. He sat until the end of the term, but was not re-elected in 1945.

Sources

References

External links 
 

1885 births
1963 deaths
Finnish male sport shooters
ISSF rifle shooters
ISSF pistol shooters
Olympic shooters of Finland
Shooters at the 1908 Summer Olympics
Shooters at the 1912 Summer Olympics
Shooters at the 1920 Summer Olympics
Shooters at the 1924 Summer Olympics
Olympic bronze medalists for Finland
Medalists at the 1920 Summer Olympics
Olympic medalists in shooting
People from Keuruu